The Pongo River or Rio Pongo is a river that flows into the Atlantic Ocean near Boffa, Guinea. Its source is located in Fouta Djallon. The surrounding area has also been known as "Pongoland" or "Bongo Country". The estuary has been designated as a Ramsar site since 1992.

History
Rio Pongo became a significant area for the setting up factories in the transatlantic slave trade. Sir George Collier listed 76 surnames of families involved in the slave trade in 1820. He was commodore of the British West Africa Squadron between 1818 and 1821 and as such organised anti-slaving patrols up the Pongo River and other surrounding areas.

In literature

Part of the plot of the historical novel Anthony Adverse – and the film made on it – is chiefly set on the Pongo River, in the last years of the 18th century and the first years of the 19th. The book's eponymous protagonist – an adventurous and highly capable young man – arrives from Cuba and in a brief time takes personal control of slave trading along the river. He amasses a considerable personal fortune, but at the price of becoming increasingly corrupted. Finally being sickened by slaving, he departs for other adventures in other continents.

References

External links
 African Diaspora Archaeology newsletter, Sept. 2006
 BirdLife International factsheet (Rio Pongo estuary, Guinea)

Rivers of Guinea
Ramsar sites in Guinea